Junee Reefs is a locality in the south east part of the Riverina, Australia.  It is situated by road, about 19 kilometres north of Old Junee and 19 kilometres south of Sebastopol.  At the 2006 census, Junee Reefs had a population of 136 people.

The Reefs Post Office opened on 1 January 1878, was renamed Junee Reefs in 1917, and closed in 1971.

Notes and references

Towns in the Riverina
Mining towns in New South Wales
Junee Shire